Richard A. Merkt (born July 30, 1949) is an American Republican Party public official, attorney, and businessman who served from 1998 to 2010 in the New Jersey General Assembly, where he represented the 25th legislative district. In his sixth term as a legislator, he unsuccessfully sought the Republican nomination for Governor of New Jersey in 2009 rather than running for re-election to the Assembly.

Noted for his interest in and knowledge of constitutional issues, Merkt served as the Assembly's Parliamentarian from 2006 to 2010. He served in the Assembly on the Appropriations Committee, the Higher Education Committee, the Judiciary Committee, the Transportation Committee, the Banking and Insurance Committee and the Intergovernmental Relations Commission.

Merkt was appointed New Jersey Deputy Attorney General and served from 1983 until 1986.  He was chief administrative officer of the NJ Division of (Casino) Gaming Enforcement during the same period.

Merkt was born in New York City and resides with his wife in Westmoreland, New Hampshire. He graduated with a B.A. in history in 1971 from Yale University, was awarded a J.D. in 1975 from the Fordham University School of Law and received an M.G.A. in 1986 from the University of Pennsylvania in Governmental Administration.  He is a certified public manager, founded the Certified Public Manager Society of New Jersey, and received a certificate in public leadership from the Darden School of the University of Virginia in 1998.

From 1986 until 2014, Merkt served as general counsel and officer for three New Jersey corporations, including two high technology manufacturing firms in Morris and Somerset counties.

In March 2011, Merkt was chosen to fill a vacancy on the Mendham Township Committee. Merkt served as deputy mayor of Mendham Township in 2012 and as mayor in 2013.  On September 15, 2014, he was appointed Borough Administrator of Mendham, New Jersey and resigned from the Mendham Township Committee.  He served as Borough Administrator from November 1, 2014, through September 30, 2017.

After moving to New Hampshire following his retirement, Merkt was elected in 2018 and again in 2020 to the New Hampshire State Republican Committee.  In 2019, he became vice chair of the Cheshire County (NH) Republican Committee. In January 2021, Merkt was elected Chair of the Cheshire County Republican party.

In December 2019, Merkt announced that he would seek a seat in the New Hampshire House of Representatives in 2020. He lost the election in November 2020.

In January, 2021, Merkt joined the founding Board of the Monadnock Freedom to Learn Coalition, the sponsoring organization for Lionheart Classical Academy, a tuition-free public school chartered by the NH State Board of Education in November 2021 and scheduled to open in Peterborough, NH, in September 2022.  He currently serves as Secretary of the Coalition and has also been appointed to the Board of Trustees for the new academy.

2009 gubernatorial campaign

On October 22, 2008, Rick Merkt declared his candidacy for the Republican nomination for Governor of New Jersey. However, he was unable to meet the fundraising thresholds necessary to appear in the state-sponsored televised debates before the primary. Thus the primary was in effect a contest between former United States Attorney for the District of New Jersey Chris Christie and former Bogota Mayor Steve Lonegan. Merkt did appear along with his two rivals in two privately sponsored radio debates before the primary, however. While Merkt received about 3% of the vote in the primary, Christie received the gubernatorial nomination. Merkt retired from the Assembly in January 2010 when his sixth term expired.

References

External links
 Assemblyman Merkt's legislative web page, New Jersey Legislature
 New Jersey Legislature financial disclosure forms
 2007 2006 2005 2004
 Assembly Member Richard A. 'Rick' Merkt, Project Vote Smart
 New Jersey Voter Information Website 2003
 Rick Merkt for Governor

1949 births
Living people
Fordham University School of Law alumni
New Hampshire Republicans
New Jersey city council members
Republican Party members of the New Jersey General Assembly
People from Mendham Township, New Jersey
Politicians from Morris County, New Jersey
University of Pennsylvania alumni
Yale University alumni
21st-century American politicians